Charles Emile Clappier (born 26 August 1867, date of death unknown) was a French fencer. He competed in the individual masters épée and sabre events at the 1900 Summer Olympics.

References

External links
 

1867 births
Year of death missing
French male épée fencers
French male sabre fencers
Olympic fencers of France
Fencers at the 1900 Summer Olympics
Sportspeople from Lyon
Place of death missing